The 1989 The Citadel Bulldogs football team represented The Citadel, The Military College of South Carolina in the 1989 NCAA Division I-AA football season.  Charlie Taaffe served as head coach for the third season.  The Bulldogs played as members of the Southern Conference and played home games at Johnson Hagood Stadium.  The 1989 season was affected by Hurricane Hugo, which damaged Johnson Hagood Stadium as the eye of the storm passed over Charleston harbor before making its way inland.  As a result, The Citadel played two "home" games at Williams-Brice Stadium, on the campus of the University of South Carolina in Columbia, South Carolina.  The hurricane struck on September 22, 1989, and the Bulldogs did not play a game again in their home stadium until November 4, 1989.

Schedule

References

Citadel Bulldogs
The Citadel Bulldogs football seasons
Citadel football